Theresa Rose Bajt (born April 5, 1956) is a former Miss Montana, and a clinical psychologist practicing in Creve Coeur, Missouri. She has also published several papers, and acted in a Dick Clark film of the week.

Biography
Theresa Rose Bajt was born on April 5, 1956 to Catholic parents in Joliet, Illinois.  Her grandparents emigrated from Croatia. Her father Jack was one of 11 children. He served in the Coast Guard in WWII.  After returning from the war he met Theresa Rose's mother, Sophia Czerkies,  a first generation American daughter of Polish and Russian immigrants.  They were married for over 50 years.

Theresa Rose was the first born of their two children.  Her sister Mary Lynn Bajt-Jaeschke, Ph.D. is a research scientist at the University of Kansas School of Medicine.

Theresa Rose's father worked for Olin Blockson for over 40 years.  Sophia worked as a factory worker to help support the family and financially allow the girls to attend college.  Both parents were dedicated to get their children the education they did not have.  Neither Theresa Rose’s mother nor father had a high school diploma.

Dr. Bajt attended  the University of Dayton for two years. She then transferred to Rocky Mountain College in Billings, Montana.  In 1977, while attending school she became Miss Montana U.S.A.  She also was a cheerleader for Rocky Mountain College.

Her experience as Miss Montana was enough to get Theresa Rose hired as a fundraiser for the Montana State Easter Seal Society.  While at a fund raising event the projector broke and Theresa Rose began to ad lib for a half-hour.  A hospital administrator was in the audience and was so impressed he offered her a position in marketing at St. Vincent Hospital in Billings, Montana. During her two years  at the job she started working on her first master's degree. After finishing her master's degree from Montana State University she was employed as Director of Deferred Prosecution.  She worked with first-time law offenders  who were offered rehabilitation instead of prosecution.  As she counseled the offenders to "Go for their dreams", she motivated herself to try for her own. She then moved to Los Angeles to pursue a career in acting and writing. Eventually, she landed a small role in the Dick Clark film of the week,  Reaching for the Stars, in 1985. Later, Theresa Rose decided to go back to school and was accepted at Harvard University in the master's degree program.  She continued on to receive her Ph.D. degree from the University of Maryland.  While attending the university she met her husband Michael Powell, Ph.D. whom she married September 2, 1989.   Michael Powell is currently a senior vice president with Optum Health.

Publishings
While in school at Harvard University Theresa Rose published several papers. The first, When Laws and Values Conflict: A dilemma for Psychologists was co-written with Ken Pope, Ph.D., the paper covers the conflict a psychologist faces with the law running a private practice.  For instance, the dilemma between revealing private information and reporting illegal activities such as child abuse or “potential harm to third parties."

A year later, she again co-authored a paper with Dr. Pope, entitled Therapist-Patient Sexual Intimacy Involving Children and Adolescents.  This paper studied the phenomenon of therapist-patient sexual intimacy and the degree to which is occurs.  The paper concluded three suggestions.  First, that people in the profession must take account of the fact that children and adolescents are involved in a number of  abuse cases by a prior therapist, and the approaches to individual and group therapy for victims of therapist patient sexual relationships.

Dr. Bajt's research has been requested internationally and was cited in the New York Times article "When Do a Therapist’s Actions Cross over the Line?"
Bajt now currently resides with her family in Missouri.  She has a private practice in Creve Coeur.

Personal life
Bajt now currently resides with her husband and two children in Wildwood, Missouri. She practices psychology for Mind Care Associates in Creve Coeur.

References

American women psychologists
University of Dayton alumni
Rocky Mountain College alumni
Harvard University alumni
Montana State University alumni
University of Maryland, College Park alumni
American people of Croatian descent
American beauty pageant winners
1956 births
Living people
21st-century American women